Magdolna is a given name. Notable people with the name include:

Magdolna Komka, née Csábi, retired Hungarian high jumper
Magdolna Kovács, Hungarian orienteering competitor
Magdolna Nyári-Kovács (1921–2005), Hungarian fencer
Magdolna Patóh (born 1948), Hungarian swimmer
Magdolna Purgly (1881–1959), the wife of Admiral Miklós Horthy
Magdolna Rúzsa (born 1985), Hungarian singer, winner of the 2006 Megasztár